Norman Douglas Good (1906-1986) was an Irish badminton player.

Biography
Norman Good was the son of badminton players Dr T. D. Good and Ada Good. Two of his siblings also played badminton at national and international level, Barbara and Derreen.

Achievements

References

1906 births
1986 deaths
Irish male badminton players
20th-century Irish people